Westmoor Park is a 162 acre park and farm located on Flagg Road in West Hartford, Connecticut. The park is open dawn to dusk daily. The farm barn is open 9am to 4pm daily for visitors to see the animals. The primary focus of the park is environmental education. It is operated by the Leisure Services Department of West Hartford.

History
After being in private ownership since the end of the 17th century, the land at Westmoor Park was donated to the town of West Hartford in March 1973. Charles Hunter officially relinquished the land to the town upon his death in January 1961, with the provision that it be passed down to his wife, Leila, for the remainder of her life. When she died in January 1973, the town of West Hartford assumed control of the land two months later.

References

External links
 Westmoor Park - official site

West Hartford, Connecticut
Parks in Hartford County, Connecticut
Nature centers in Connecticut